Matti Forss (born May 17, 1957 in Rauma, Finland) is a retired professional ice hockey player who played in the SM-liiga.

Playing career
He played for HIFK and Lukko. He was inducted into the Finnish Hockey Hall of Fame in 1998.

Career statistics

External links

 Finnish Hockey Hall of Fame bio

1957 births
Finnish ice hockey centres
HIFK (ice hockey) players
Houston Aeros draft picks
Lukko players
Living people
Ice hockey players with retired numbers
St. Louis Blues draft picks
People from Rauma, Finland
Sportspeople from Satakunta